The 12th Solitude Grand Prix was a non-Championship motor race Formula One race, held on 15 July 1962 at the Solitudering, near Stuttgart. The race was run over 25 laps of the circuit, and was won by Dan Gurney in a Porsche 804.

Race Report
The 1961 Solitude Grand Prix had been very exciting, and 320,000 people showed up in 1962 for a new record attendance. However, the race proved less than exciting, with only Lotus and Porsche sending their cars in addition to numerous privateers. Ferrari and Scuderia SSS Venezia stayed away due to the ongoing Italian metal workers' strike, while UDT/Laystall and Yeoman Credit Racing both stayed home to repair cars damaged in the 1962 French Grand Prix.

Jo Bonnier was hindered at the start by a photographer on the track, and the race began with Gurney leading Clark, then Bonnier, and then Trevor Taylor. These positions remained unchanged until just past the middle of the race, when there was a rainsquall and all of the oil and rubber deposits on the track made for very slippery conditions. Clark slipped backwards into a fence and had to retire with a damaged exhaust and rear end. Taylor also slipped off the track a few times, and the tempo dropped steadily. As an indication thereof, Gurney's average speed for the first fifteen laps was  while it was only  for the last ten. Ian Burgess' Cooper-special was best privateer in fourth. Jo Siffert had an electric short which led to a small fire. Luckily for the spectators, Solitude also hosted the German Motorcycle Grand Prix and there was a GT-race, won by Kalman von Czazy in a Ferrari 250GTO which he had crashed during practice.

Results

 Porsche System Engineering entered a third car but no driver was assigned and the entry was not used.

References

Solitude Grand Prix
Solituderennen
Solitude Grand Prix